Harmon Township may refer to the following townships in the United States:

 Harmon Township, Washington County, Arkansas
 Harmon Township, Lee County, Illinois